"Scheiss Liebe" is a song by German singer LaFee. It was written by Bob Arnz, Gerd Zimmermann and LaFee for her fourth studio album, Ring frei. The song is the album's fifth track and was released as the album's second single on 6 March 2009.

Track listing 
These are the formats and track listings of major single releases of "Scheiss Liebe".
CD single: two-track edition
 "Scheiss Liebe" (single version) – 3:43
 "Für dich" (live) – 3:48

Charts

References

External links 
LaFee official website

2008 songs
LaFee songs
2009 singles
Songs written by Bob Arnz
EMI Records singles
Songs written by Gerd Zimmermann (songwriter)